Ramazan İshak Sarı is a Turkish freestyle wrestler competing in the 79 kg division. He is a member of Ankara Aski.

Career 
In 2021, he won the gold medal in the men's 79 kg event at the 2021 European U23 Wrestling Championship held in Skopje, North Macedonia. He won the silver medal in the 79 kg event at the 2021 U23 World Wrestling Championships held in Belgrade, Serbia.

References

External links
 

Living people
Turkish male sport wrestlers
1998 births
21st-century Turkish people